Jeff Corey (born Arthur Zwerling;  August 10, 1914 – August 16, 2002) was an American stage and screen actor who became a well-respected acting teacher after being blacklisted in the 1950s.

Life and career 
Corey attended New Utrecht High School in Brooklyn and was active in the school's Dramatic Society. In the mid-1930s, he acted with the Clare Tree Major Children's Theater of New York. When Corey began making films, his agent suggested that he change his name from Arthur Zwerling, and he did so.

He worked with Jules Dassin, Elia Kazan, John Randolph and other politically liberal theatrical personalities. Although he attended some meetings of the Communist Party, Corey never joined. A World War II veteran, Corey served in the United States Navy. His memoir, Improvising Out Loud: My Life Teaching Hollywood How To Act, which he wrote with his daughter, Emily Corey, is published by the University Press of Kentucky. His longtime friend and former student Leonard Nimoy wrote the foreword for the book.

Hollywood 
Corey moved to Hollywood in 1940 and became a character actor. One of his film roles was in  Superman and the Mole Men (1951), which was later edited to a two-part episode of the television series The Adventures of Superman, retitled "The Unknown People". His portrayal of a xenophobic vigilante coincidentally reflected what was about to happen to him. Prior to that, Corey appeared in Frankenstein Meets the Wolf Man. (1943), as one of the men who discover the body of the vagrant Freddy Jolly.

Blacklisted 
Corey's career was halted in the early 1950s, when he was summoned before the House Un-American Activities Committee. Corey refused to give names of alleged Communists and subversives in the entertainment industry and went so far as to ridicule the panel by offering critiques of the testimony of the previous witnesses. This behavior led to his being blacklisted for 12 years. "Most of us were retired Reds. We had left it, at least I had, years before," Corey told Patrick McGilligan, the co-author of Tender Comrades: A Backstory of the Hollywood Blacklist, who teaches film at Marquette University. "The only issue was, did you want to just give them their token names so you could continue your career, or not? I had no impulse to defend a political point of view that no longer interested me particularly ... They just wanted two new names so they could hand out more subpoenas."

During his blacklisting, Corey drew upon his experience in various actors' workshops (including the Actors' Lab, which he helped establish) by seeking work as an acting teacher.  He soon became one of the most influential teachers in Hollywood. His students, at various times, included Robert Blake, James Coburn, Richard Chamberlain, James Dean, Jane Fonda, Peter Fonda, Michael Forest, James Hong, Luana Anders, Sally Kellerman, Shirley Knight, Bruce Lee, Penny Marshall, Jack Nicholson, Roger Corman, Darrell M. Smith, Diane Varsi, Sharon Tate, Rita Moreno, Leonard Nimoy, Sally Forrest, Anthony Perkins, Rob Reiner, Robert Towne, Barbra Streisand, and Robin Williams.

Back to work in the 1960s 
In 1962, Corey began working in films again, and remained active into the 1990s. He played Hoban in The Cincinnati Kid (1965), Tom Chaney, the principal villain in True Grit (1969), and Sheriff Bledsoe in Butch Cassidy and the Sundance Kid (also 1969), who says to the title characters, "I never met a soul more affable than you, Butch, or faster than the Kid, but you're still nothing but two-bit outlaws on the dodge. It's over, don't you get that? Your times is over and you're gonna die bloody, and all you can do is choose where." In Seconds (1966), a science-fiction drama film directed by John Frankenheimer and starring Rock Hudson, Corey with Will Geer and John Randolph played wealthy executives who opt to restart their lives with new identities.

Corey played a police detective in the psychological thriller The Premonition (1976) and he reprised the role of Sheriff Bledsoe in the prequel Butch and Sundance: The Early Days (1979). He also played Wild Bill Hickok in Little Big Man (1970). Corey directed some of the screen tests for Superman (1978), which can be seen in the DVD extras, and played Lex Luthor in several try-outs.

Television 
Corey made guest appearances on many television series. He appeared as murder victim Carl Bascom in the Perry Mason episode, "The Case of the Reckless Rockhound" (1964). He was featured on science-fiction series, too, including an episode of The Outer Limits ("O.B.I.T.", 1963) in which he played Byron Lomax; Star Trek ("The Cloud Minders", 1969) in which he played High Advisor Plasus; as Caspay in Beneath the Planet of the Apes (1970), and Babylon 5 ("Z'ha'dum", 1996) in which he played Justin.

Corey played Dr. Miles Talmadge on Rod Serling's Night Gallery season-one episode one, "The Dead Man", on December 16, 1970. Corey detailed his television work on Night Gallery in an interview in February 1973 aboard the SS Universe Campus of Chapman College. He was proudest of this work, for which he received an Emmy nomination.

During the 1970s, Corey also played Dr. Scott Rivers, an older man with whom Carol Lester (the character played by Marcia Wallace) becomes romantically involved, in 1973 in "Old Man Rivers," episode 31 of the Bob Newhart Show. In 1974, he appeared in "Murder on the 13th Floor," episode 6 of the James Stewart legal drama Hawkins. He also appeared in the short-lived 1974 series Paper Moon, a comedy about a father and his presumed daughter roaming through the American Midwest during the Great Depression based on the 1973 film of the same name.

In the 1980s, Corey was in a 1984 episode of Bob Newhart's show Newhart as a judge. He played a man who believed he was Santa Claus in a 1984 episode of Night Court. He also had a role in a third-season episode of Night Court in 1986 as a burned-out judge who had lost his grip on reality.

Corey was the voice of the villain Silvermane (in elderly form) in Spider-Man: The Animated Series in 1994.

Radio 
In the era of old-time radio, Corey portrayed Detective Lieutenant Ybarra on the crime drama The Adventures of Philip Marlowe on NBC (1947) and CBS (1948–1951).

Personal life and death 
Corey and his wife Hope had been married for 64 years at the time of his death at the age of 88 on August 16, 2002.

Filmography

Film 

 I Am the Law (1938) as Thug (uncredited)
 ...One Third of a Nation... (1939) as Man in Crowd at Fir (uncredited)
 Third Finger, Left Hand (1940) as Johann (uncredited)
 Bitter Sweet (1940) as Second Man on Stairs (uncredited)
 You'll Find Out (1940) as Mr. Corey (uncredited)
 Petticoat Politics (1941) as Henry Trotter
 The Lady from Cheyenne (1941) as Reporter (uncredited)
 Mutiny in the Arctic (1941) as The Cook
 The Devil and Daniel Webster (1941) as Tom Sharp (uncredited)
 You Belong to Me (1941) as Mr. Greener (uncredited)
 Paris Calling (1941) as Secretary (uncredited)
 North to the Klondike (1942) as Lafe Jordan
 Roxie Hart (1942) as Orderly (uncredited)
 Who Is Hope Schuyler? (1942) as Medical Examiner
 The Man Who Wouldn't Die (1942) as Coroner Tim Larsen
 Small Town Deb (1942) as Hector
 Syncopation (1942) as Kit's Attorney (uncredited)
 The Postman Didn't Ring (1942) as Harwood Green
 Girl Trouble (1942) as Mr. Mooney (uncredited)
 Tennessee Johnson (1942) as Captain (uncredited)
 Frankenstein Meets the Wolf Man (1943) as Crypt Keeper (uncredited)
 The Moon Is Down (1943) as Albert (uncredited)
 Aerial Gunner (1943) as Flight Crew Member (uncredited)
 My Friend Flicka (1943) as Tim Murphy
 Somewhere in the Night (1946) as Bank Teller (uncredited)
 Joe Palooka, Champ (1946) as Reporter (uncredited)
 It Shouldn't Happen to a Dog (1946) as Sam Black (uncredited)
 Rendezvous with Annie (1946) as Howard (uncredited)
 The Killers (1946) as "Blinky" Franklin (uncredited)
 The Shocking Miss Pilgrim (1947) as Stenographer (uncredited)
 California (1947) as Clem (uncredited)
 Ramrod (1947) as Bice
 Miracle on 34th Street (1947) as Reporter (uncredited)
 Brute Force (1947) as Freshman Stack
 Hoppy's Holiday (1947) as Jed
 Unconquered (1947) as Trapper (uncredited)
 The Flame (1947) as Stranger (uncredited)
 The Gangster (1947) as Karty's Brother-in-Law (uncredited)
 Alias a Gentleman (1948) as Zu
 The Wreck of the Hesperus (1948) as Joshua Hill
 Let's Live Again (1948) as Bartender
 Homecoming (1948) as Cigarette Smoker (uncredited)
 I, Jane Doe (1948) as Immigration Officer (uncredited)
 Canon City (1948) as Carl Schwartzmiller
 A Southern Yankee (1948) as Union Cavalry Sergeant (uncredited)
 Joan of Arc (1948) as Prison Guard
 Kidnapped (1948) as Shaun
 Wake of the Red Witch (1948) as Mr. Loring
 Hideout (1949) as Beecham
 City Across the River (1949) as Police Lieutenant Louie Macon
 Roughshod (1949) as Jed Graham
 Home of the Brave (1949) as Doctor
 Follow Me Quietly (1949) as Police Sgt. Art Collins
 Scene of the Crime (1949) as Man Arrested with Switchblade (uncredited)
 Bagdad (1949) as Mohammed Jao
 The Nevadan (1950) as Bart
 Singing Guns (1950) as Richards
 The Outriders (1950) as Keeley
 Rock Island Trail (1950) as Abraham Lincoln
 Bright Leaf (1950) as John Barton
 The Next Voice You Hear... (1950) as Freddie Dibson
 Fourteen Hours (1951) as Police Sgt. Farley
 Rawhide (1951) as Luke Davis
 Only the Valiant (1951) as Joe Harmony
 New Mexico (1951) as Coyote
 Sirocco (1951) as Feisal (uncredited)
 The Prince Who Was a Thief (1951) as Emir Mokar
 Never Trust a Gambler (1951) as Lou Brecker
 Red Mountain (1951) as Sgt. Skee
 Superman and the Mole Men (1951) as Luke Benson
 The Balcony (1963) as Bishop
 The Yellow Canary (1963) as Joe Pyle
 Lady in a Cage (1964) as George L. Brady Jr. aka Repent
 The Treasure of the Aztecs (1965) as Abraham Lincoln
 Pyramid of the Sun God (1965) (uncredited)
 Once a Thief (1965) as Lt. Kebner SFPD
 Mickey One (1965) as Larry Fryer
 The Cincinnati Kid (1965) as Hoban
 Seconds (1966) as Mr. Ruby
 In Cold Blood (1967) as Mr. Hickock
 The Boston Strangler (1968) as John Asgeirsson
 Impasse (1969) as Wombat
 True Grit (1969) as Tom Chaney
 Butch Cassidy and the Sundance Kid (1969) as Sheriff Bledsoe
 Beneath the Planet of the Apes (1970) as Caspay
 Getting Straight (1970) as Dr. Edward Willhunt
 They Call Me Mister Tibbs! (1970) as Captain Marden
 Cover Me Babe (1970) as Paul
 Little Big Man (1970) as Wild Bill Hickok
 Clay Pigeon (1971) as Clinic Doctor
 Shoot Out (1971) as Trooper
 Catlow (1971) as Merridew
 Something Evil (1972, TV Movie) as Gehrmann
 Paper Tiger (1975) as Mr. King
 Banjo Hackett: Roamin' Free (1976) as Judge Janeway
 The Premonition (1976) as Lieutenant Mark Denver
 The Last Tycoon (1976) as Doctor
 Rooster: Spurs of Death! (1977) as Kink
 Moonshine County Express (1977) as Hagen
 Curse of the Black Widow (1977, TV Movie) as Aspa Soldado
 Oh, God! (1977) as Rabbi Silverstone
 Captains Courageous (1977, TV Movie) as Salters
 Jennifer (1978) as Luke Baylor
 The Wild Geese (1978) as Mr. Martin
 The Pirate (1978, TV Movie) as Prince Feiyad
 Butch and Sundance: The Early Days (1979) as Sheriff Ray Bledsoe
 Up River (1979) as Bagshaw
 Battle Beyond the Stars (1980) as Zed
 The Sword and the Sorcerer (1982) as Craccus
 Conan the Destroyer (1984) as Grand Vizier
 Creator (1985) as Dean Harrington
 Fist of the North Star (1986, Streamline) as Ryuuken / Narrator (1991) (English version, voice)
 Tajna manastirske rakije (1988) as Colonel Frazier
 Messenger of Death (1988) as Willis Beecham
 Bird on a Wire (1990) as Lou Baird
 The Judas Project (1990) as Poneras
 Ruby Cairo (1992) as Joe Dick
 Beethoven's 2nd (1993) as Gus, the Janitor
 Color of Night (1994) as Ashland
 Surviving the Game (1994) as Hank
 American Hero (1997)
 Ted (1998) as Professor

 Television 

 The Outer Limits – season one, episode seven – "O.B.I.T." – Byron Lomax (1963)
 The Wild Wild West – two episodes:
 "The Night of a Thousand Eyes" – Captain Ansel Coffin (1965)
 "The Night of the Underground Terror" – Colonel Tacitus Mosely (1968)
 Bonanza – two episodes:
 Season eight, episode 13 – "The Bridegroom" – Tuck Dowling (1966)
 Season 12, episode 15 – "A Single Pilgrim" – Frank Brennan (1971)
 Star Trek – season three, episode 21 – "The Cloud Minders" – Plasus (1969)
 Hawaii Five-O – two episodes:
 "King of the Hill" – Doctor William Hanson (1969)
 "Highest Castle, Deepest Grave" – Duncan (1971)
 Gunsmoke – episode – "The Night Riders" –  Judge Procter (1969)
 Night Gallery – episode – "The Dead Man" – Dr. Miles Talmadge (1970)
 Mannix – episode – "Overkill" – Paul Sorenson (1971)
 Alias Smith and Jones – two episodes (1972):
 "The Men That Corrupted Hadleyburg" (Director)
 "The Day the Amnesty Came Through" – Governor George W. Baxter
 Walt Disney's Wonderful World of Color – episode – "The High Flying Spy: Part 1" – Gen. McClellan (1972)
 Search – episode – "Short Circuit" – Dr. Carl Moen (1972)
 Police Story – episode – "The Big Walk" – Defense Attorney (1973)
 Owen Marshall: Counselor at Law – episode – "Poor Children of Eve" – Monsignor Morell (1973)
 The Bob Newhart Show – episode – "Old Man Rivers" – Doctor Scott Rivers (1973)
 Hawkins – episode – "Murder on the 13th Floor" (1974)
 Paper Moon – episode – "Impostor" – Jeb Crew (1974)
 The Six Million Dollar Man – episode – "Lost Love" – Orin Thatcher (1975)
 Starsky and Hutch – episode – "Death Ride" – Andrew Mello (1975)
 Kojak – episode – "A House of Prayer, a Den of Thieves" – Frank Raynor (1975)
 McCloud – episode – "Our Man in the Harem" – Sheik Kipal (1976)
 The Bionic Woman – episode – "The Night Demon" – Thomas Bearclaw (1977)
 Testimony of Two Men – William Simpson (1977)
 Greatest Heroes of the Bible – episode – "David & Goliath" – Saul (1978)
 Fantasy Island – episode – "Let the Goodtimes Roll/Nightmare/The Tiger" – Tibur (uncredited) (1978)
 Barney Miller – two episodes:
 "The Prisoner" – Ralph Timmons (1978)
 "The Desk" – Caleb Webber (1979)
 One Day at a Time – episode – "Grandma Leaves Grandpa" –  Mr. Romano (1979)
 Little House on the Prairie – two episodes:
 "Barn Burner" – Judge Parker (1979)
 "Blind Justice" – Edgar Mills (1981)
 Night Court – two episodes:
 "Santa Goes Downtown" – Santa (1984)
 "The Night Off" – Judge Hirsch (1986)
 Simon & Simon – episode – "Slither" – Police Sgt. Spencer (1985)
 The A-Team – episode – "Family Reunion" – A.J. Bancroft (1986)
 Perfect Strangers – episode – "Taking Stock" – Henry Casselman (1987)
 War of the Worlds – episode  –  "Eye for an Eye" – Francis Flannery (1988)
 Jake and the Fatman – episode – "It All Depends on You" – Judge Ralph Colella (1989)
 Beauty and the Beast – episode – "The Reckoning" – Winston Burke 
(1989)
 Roseanne - Season 1, Episode 21 - "Death and Stuff" - Salesman (1989)
(1990)
 Picket Fences – episode – "This Little Piggy" – The Captain (1995)
 The Marshal – season one, episode seven – "The Bounty Hunter" – Alex Cooper (1995)
 Spider-Man: The Animated Series – two seasons, five episodes – voice of Elderly Silvermane (1995–1997):
 Season two (Neogenic Nightmare)
 "Chapter 1: The Insidious Six"
 "Chapter 2: Battle of the Insidious Six"
 "Chapter 11: Tablet of Time"
 "Chapter 12: Ravages of Time"
 Season four (Partners in Danger)
 "Chapter 5: Partners"
 Babylon 5 – season three (Point of No Return), episode 22 – "Z'ha'dum" – Justin (1996)

 Other credits 
 The Adventures of Philip Marlowe – radio series – Lieutenant Ebarra ("various times" (1948–1951))
 Inside Magoo – animated short – voice of Doctor (1960)
 Alias Smith and Jones – director – episodes – "The Men That Corrupted Hadleyburg" and "The Day the Amnesty Came Through" (1972)

 References 

 General sources 
 
 

 External links 

 Improvising Out Loud
 Excerpts from Improvising Out Loud from Google Books
 
 
 
The Jeff Corey Collection is held by the Jerome Lawrence and Robert E. Lee Theatre Research Institute, The Ohio State University Libraries.

 "Model Citizens", Back Stage West'' Interview.  Rob Kendt (1997-10-16).

1914 births
2002 deaths
American male film actors
American male radio actors
American male stage actors
American male television actors
American people of Austrian-Jewish descent
American people of Russian-Jewish descent
Jewish American male actors
Accidental deaths from falls
Drama teachers
Hollywood blacklist
People from Brooklyn
20th-century American male actors
New Utrecht High School alumni
20th-century American Jews
21st-century American Jews